Harpalus kagyzmanicus is a species of ground beetle in the subfamily Harpalinae. It was described by Kataev in 1984.

References

kagyzmanicus
Beetles described in 1984